The 2008–09 OB I bajnokság season was the 72nd season of the OB I bajnokság, the top level of ice hockey in Hungary. Six teams participated in the league, and Alba Volan Szekesfehervar won the championship.

First round

Second round

Playoffs

Pre-Playoffs
Ujpesti TE - Alba Volan Szekesfehervar II 8-3, 4-0
Budapest Stars - Miskolci JJSE 5-4, 3-2
Dunaujvarosi Acelbikak - Ferencvarosi TC 6-2, 5-8, 6-2

Semifinals
Ujpesti TE - Budapest Stars 3-0 on series
Alba Volan Szekesfhervar - Dunaujvarosi Acelbikak 3-0 on series

Final
Alba Volan Szekesfehervar - Ujpesti TE 4-1 on series

3rd place
Dunaujvarosi Acelbikak - Budapest Stars 3-0 on series

5th-7th place

OB I bajnoksag seasons
Hun
OB